Gazprom Transgaz Belarus (former name: Beltransgaz) is a natural gas infrastructure and transportation company of Belarus. It operates the main natural gas transit pipelines through Belarus—Northern Lights and Yamal–Europe.  Beltransgaz was founded in 1992 on the bases of Zapadtransgaz, a company responsible for the gas transit through Belarus. The company is owned by the Russian gas company Gazprom.

References

External links

  

Oil and gas companies of Belarus
Natural gas pipeline companies
Gazprom subsidiaries
Companies based in Minsk
Energy companies established in 1992
Non-renewable resource companies established in 1992